The 2006 season was Molde's 31st season in the top flight of Norwegian football. In Tippeligaen they finished 14th and were relegated to the 2007 Norwegian First Division. Molde also competed in the Norwegian Cup where they were knocked out in the third round by Follo.

As winners of the 2005 Norwegian Football Cup, Molde qualified for the 2006–07 UEFA Cup second qualifying round. Molde managed to qualify for the first round where they were defeated 2–0 on aggregate by Scottish club Rangers.

Squad

 (on loan from King Faisal Babes)

As of end of season.

Transfers

In

Out

Loans in

Loans out

Trial

Competitions

Tippeligaen

Results summary

Results by round

Results

Table

Norwegian Cup

UEFA Cup

Qualifying rounds

First round

Squad statistics

Appearances and goals

Note: The Norwegian Cup second-round game vs KIL/Hemne lacks information. 2-4 players miss one game because of this. The players mentioned in the match summary in Romsdals Budstikke after the game are included in the statistics. 

|-
|colspan="14"|Players who left Molde during the season:

|}

Goal Scorers

See also
Molde FK seasons

References

External links
nifs.no

2006
Molde